Gerardo Reyero Muñoz (born October 2, 1965 in Puebla), better known as Gerardo Reyero, is a Mexican voice actor. His specialty is serious older men and villains, though he occasionally plays lighter roles too.

Filmography
 "Beyblade: Metal Masters" - Dr Zigurat (Final Boss) (2013)
 Narrator FBI (Multiplayer) in Call of Duty: Black Ops II (VG) (2012)
 Additional voices in Halo 4 (VG) (2012)
 Stump Smash and Tree Rex in Skylanders: Giants (VG) (2012)
 Stump Smash in Skylanders: Spyro's Adventure (VG) (2011)
 Logan in Fable III''' (VG) (2010)
 Sergeant Johnson in Halo: Reach (VG) (2010)
 Angels and Archangels voices in Darksiders (VG) (2010)
 The Presenter of Night Springs, Maurice Horton, Possessed and additional voices in Alan Wake (VG) (2010)
 Chief of T.U.F.F. in T.U.F.F. Puppy (2010–2015)
 Sergeant Johnson in  Halo 3 ODST (2009)
 Dog "Choke" L. McGraw and additional voices in Fable II (2008) (VG)
 Bryan Mills in Taken (2008) (Liam Neeson)
 Sergeant Johnson in  Halo 3 (VG) (2007)
 Armand in La Leyenda del Zorro (2005)
 Senator Bail Organa in Star Wars-Episodio III: La Venganza de los Sith (2005)
 V en V for Vendetta (2005)
 Capitanazo in La Casa de los Dibujos (2004–2007)
 Aspirant André Matias in Elite Squad (2007) (voiceover for André Ramiro)
 Rella's father in Cinderella Boy (2004–2005)
 Newscaster in Yu-Gi-Oh! La Película (2004)
 Dr. Ivan Krank in Teacher's Pet (2004 film) (2004)
 Vincent Volaju in Cowboy Bebop: La Película (2003)
 Might Guy in Naruto (2002)
 Daniel in Love Actually (2003) (Liam Neeson)
 Geordi La Forge in Viaje a las Estrellas: Némesis (2002) (voiceover for LeVar Burton)
 Minoru Fujii in Hajime no Ippo (2002)
 MetaKnight in Kirby: Right Back at Ya! (2002)
 Gustav in El Castillo de Cagliostro (2002)
 Senator Bail Organa in Star Wars-Episodio II: El Ataque de los Clones (2002)
 Ardeth Bay in La Momia Regresa Khalim in Yu-Gi-Oh! Duel Monsters (2001–2005)
 Belthazor in Charmed (2000–2006)
 Red Foreman in That 70s Show (2000–2006)
 Coach Don Hauser in The Sopranos (2000–2006)
 David Scatino in The Sopranos (2000–2006)
 Captain Hero in Drawn Together (2004-2007)
 Freezer in Dragon Ball GT (2000)
 Devimon in Digimon Adventure (1999–2000)
 Snowball in Animal Farm (1999)
 Ardeth Bay in La Momia (1999)
 Geordi La Forge in Viaje a las Estrellas: Insurrección (1998) (voiceover for LeVar Burton)
 Aaron in The Prince of Egypt (1998)
 Brock Lovett in Titanic (1997 film) (1997)
 Lieutenant Jackson Briggs aka Jaxx in Mortal Kombat: Annihilation (1997)
 Geordi La Forge in Viaje a las Estrellas: Primer Contacto (1996) (voiceover for LeVar Burton)
 Benvolio in William Shakespeare's Romeo y Julieta (1996)
 Freezer in Dragon Ball Z (1997-1999)
 Mez in Dragon Ball Z (1997)
 Tao Pai Pai in Dragon Ball (1996)
 Nam in Dragon Ball (1996)
 Darien Chiba/Tuxedo Mask in Sailor Moon (1996–1999) and its movie spinoffs (1997–1999)
 Michael Collins in Michael Collins (1996) (Liam Neeson)
 President Whitmore in Dia de la Independencia (1996)
 Daitetsu Kunikida in Blue Seed (1996)
 Geordi La Forge in Viaje a las Estrellas: La Nueva Generación (1994) (voiceover for LeVar Burton)
 Mikado Sanzenin in Ranma ½: Big Trouble in Nekonron, China (1994)
 Gardok Odama in Zillion: Burning Night (1994)
 Mikado Sanzenin in Ranma ½ (1993–1997)
 Yuta in Mermaid's Scar (1993)
 Dr. Frasier Crane in Frasier (1993–2004) (voiceover for Kelsey Grammer)
 T-1000 in Terminator 2: El Juicio Final (1991) (voiceover for Robert Patrick)
 Jedediah Tucker Ward in Class Action (1990) (voiceover for Gene Hackman)
 Jerry Seinfeld in Seinfeld (1990–1998) (voiceover for Jerry Seinfeld)
 Cíclope/Scott Summers in Spider-Man (1994 animated series) Scott Summers/Cíclope in the X-Men animated series (1989–1992) (Voiceover for Norm Spencer)
 Sgt. Johnny Gallagher in The Package (film) (1989) (voiceover for Gene Hackman)
 Geordi La Forge in Viaje a las Estrellas: La Nueva Generación (1987–1994) (voiceover for LeVar Burton)
 Scilla Io and Canes Venatici Asterion in Los Caballeros del Zodíaco (1987)
 Detective Bill Vukovich in Terminator (1984) (voiceover for Lance Henriksen)
 Han Solo in Star Wars Episode VI: Return of the Jedi (1983) (voiceover for Harrison Ford) (1997 redub) 
 LeVar Burton in Reading Rainbow (1983–2006)
 Dr. Frasier Crane in Cheers (1982–1993) (voiceover for Kelsey Grammer)
 Han Solo in Star Wars Episode V: The Empire Strikes Back (1980) (voiceover for Harrison Ford) (1997 redub) 
 Reverend Frank Cross in La Aventura del Poseidón (1979) (voiceover for Gene Hackman)
 Benjamin Franklin "Hawkeye" Pierce in M*A*S*H (film) (1978) (voiceover for Donald Sutherland)
 Han Solo in Star Wars Episode IV: A New Hope (1977) (voiceover for Harrison Ford) (1997 redub) 
 Jimmy "Popeye" Doyle in La Conexión Francesa (1977) (his debut role) (voiceover for Gene Hackman)
 Jimmy Cooper in The O.C. (2003)
 Ben Harmon in American Horror Story'' (2011)

References

External links 
 
 
 

1965 births
Living people
Mexican male voice actors